François Bazaramba (born 1 January 1951 in Nshili, Gikongoro Province, Ruanda-Urundi) is a Rwandan sentenced to life imprisonment in Finland for participating in the Rwandan genocide in 1994. The Bazaramba case is historic in Finnish legal history because it was the first time anyone was sentenced under Finland's "crimes against humanity" laws (section 1 of Chapter 11 of the Criminal Code) since the international norms against genocide were implemented in national law.  The case was appealed up to the Supreme Court of Finland, which upheld the conviction.

Life

While living in Rwanda, Bazaramba worked as a teacher and a headmaster for a vocational school. Later he became a pastor in the Zambian Baptist Church.

Bazaramba arrived in Finland in 2003 as a refugee. During background checks, the Finnish Immigration Service found his name in a Human Rights Watch report. The police investigation started in 2006, and the National Bureau of Investigation sent investigators to Rwanda. Bazaramba was taken into custody in 2007.

Rwanda requested Bazaramba to be extradited in February 2009, but the Finnish Ministry of Justice denied the request.

The trial started in June 2009 in the District Court of Porvoo. In September, the court traveled to Rwanda to hear witnesses. Bazaramba stayed in Finland and watched the sessions via a video link which was translated into French to him because he doesn't speak Finnish. 

In February 2010, the court traveled to Tanzania to hear witnesses from five African countries. Altogether, more than 60 witnesses were heard.

In June 2010, Bazaramba was convicted and given a life sentence.  According to the findings of the Finnish court, he orchestrated deadly attacks, and organised the torching of Tutsi homes.  He also was convicted of spreading anti-Tutsi propaganda and inciting "killings through fomenting anger and contempt towards Tutsis".  The Helsingin Sanomat reported that he was acquitted of 10 counts of murder and of providing training and acquiring weapons.

Bazaramba appealed his conviction to the Helsinki Court of Appeal. Witnesses were again heard in Rwanda and Tanzania. In March 2012, the appeals court convicted Bazaramba and gave him a life sentence. He appealed to the Supreme Court of Finland, which denied the appeal.

In 2013, Bazaramba appealed to the European Court of Human Rights with the claim that some of the witnesses had been tortured.

In January 2019, the Helsinki Court of Appeal rejected Bazaramba's request to be paroled.

In March 2021, the Helsinki Court rejected once again Bazaramba`s request to be paroled with motivation that the acts of crime he has done is considered so serious that he should be in jail longer than average prisoner with a life sentence.

References 

Rwandan prisoners sentenced to life imprisonment
Rwandan Christian clergy
Rwandan genocide
1951 births
Prisoners sentenced to life imprisonment by Finland
Living people
Rwandan Baptists
Rwandan people convicted of genocide
Rwandan people imprisoned abroad
Rwandan expatriates in Finland
20th-century Baptists